The Canton Tower, formally Guangzhou TV Astronomical and Sightseeing Tower, is a -tall multipurpose observation tower in the Haizhu District of Guangzhou (alternatively romanized as Canton). The tower was topped out in 2009 and it became operational on 29 September 2010 for the 2010 Asian Games. The tower briefly held the title of tallest tower in the world, replacing the CN Tower, before being surpassed by the Tokyo Skytree. It was the tallest structure in China prior to the topping out of the Shanghai Tower on 3 August 2013, and is now the second-tallest tower and the fifth-tallest freestanding structure in the world.

Naming and etymology 
There had been a long discussion about the naming of the Canton Tower since the commencement of its construction in 2005 after the groundbreaking ceremony. In September 2020, at the request of the tower's investor, Guangzhou Daily launched a contest for naming proposals. The contest attracted over  valid entries, among which "Haixin Tower" was awarded the first prize. The name alluded to the city's historical setting as the start of the Maritime Silk Road and the tower's geographical proximity to Haixinsha Island. However, this name was considered obscure to people unfamiliar with the history of the city. Local residents continued to refer to the tower by various nicknames including "Slim Waist", "Twisted Firewood" (a metaphor for "stubborn" in Cantonese) and "Yangdianfeng" (homophone of "epilepsy" in colloquial Chinese).

The Naming was reconsidered in 2010. After surveying a broad range of public opinions, "Canton Tower" was decided as the official English name and announced at the end of September 2010. The new English name, which alludes to the city's prosperous past, was considered the most identifying and least ambiguous among the multitude of proposals.

History 
Canton Tower was constructed by Guangzhou New Television Tower Group. It is designed by the Dutch architects Mark Hemel and Barbara Kuit of Information Based Architecture, together with Arup, the international design, engineering and business consulting firm headquartered in London, United Kingdom. In 2004, Information Based Architecture and Arup won the international competition, in which many internationally large architectural offices participated. The same year the IBA – Arup team in Amsterdam, developed the tower's concept design. In later stages, IBA cooperated mainly with the local Chinese office of Arup and a Local Design Institute. Subsequently, in 2005, the groundbreaking of the Canton Tower took place.

The tower, although not fully completed, opened to the public on 1 October 2010 in time for the 16th Asian Games, hosted by Guangzhou in November 2010. The rooftop observatory finally received its official opening in December 2011.

Structure and construction 
The Canton tower's twisted shape or hyperboloid structure corresponds to the Russian Empire patent No. 1896, dated 12 March 1899 received by Vladimir Shukhov, the Russian engineer and architect. The structure is similar to the Adziogol Lighthouse (designed by Vladimir Shukhov in 1910) in Ukraine's Dnepr delta.

Structural concept 
The tower was designed by Information Based Architecture and Arup. The Arup team led by structural engineer Prof. Dr. Joop Paul introduced near mass customization to the joint design, in combination with parametric design methods, and applied a simple structural concept of three elements: columns, rings and braces, to this more complex geometry.

The waist of the tower contains a  open-air skywalk where visitors can physically climb the tower. There are outdoor gardens set within the structure, and at the top, just above , a large open-air observation deck.

The interior of the tower is subdivided into programmatic zones with various functions, including TV and radio transmission facilities, observatory decks, revolving restaurants, computer gaming, restaurants, exhibition spaces, conference rooms, shops, and 4D cinemas.

A deck at the base of the tower hides the tower's functional workings. All infrastructural connections – metro and bus stations – are situated underground. This level also includes exhibition spaces, a food court, a commercial space, a parking area for cars and coaches. There are two types of elevators: slow-speed panoramic and high-speed double-decker.

The zone from  consists of a 4D cinema, a play-hall area, restaurants, coffee shops and outdoor gardens with teahouses. Parts of the skywalk's floors are laid with transparent glass.

The top zone of the tower begins above the stairway, housing various technical functions as well as a two-story rotating restaurant, a tuned mass damper and the upper observation levels. From the upper observation levels it is possible to ascend even higher, via a further set of the stairs, to a terraced observation square rising above the tower's top ring.

The twist 
These two ellipses are rotated relative to another. The tightening caused by the rotation between the two ellipses forms a "waist" and a densification of material halfway up the tower. This means that the lattice structure, which at the bottom of the tower is porous and spacious, becomes denser at waist level. The waist itself becomes tight, like a twisted rope; transparency is reduced and views to the outside are limited. Further up the tower the lattice opens again, accentuated here by the tapering of the structural column-tubes.

Rooftop observatory 
The indoor public observatory is 449 m above the ground, which takes the form of a terraced elliptical space, roughly half the size of a standard football field. Opened in December 2011, the rooftop at 488 m was the highest and largest outdoor observation deck in the world, taking over the title from the observation deck of Burj Khalifa at 452m. This remained the case until 14 October 2014, when the record of highest outdoor observatory was retaken by Burj Khalifa when it opened its new observatory called at the Top – Sky, at a height of 555m.

The installation is described by the media as a Ferris wheel; however, its passenger cars are not suspended from the rim of a wheel and remain horizontal without being fully rotated, and the track, which follows the incline of the roof, is closer to the horizontal than the vertical.

Architectural lighting design 
At night, the tower glows and emits light, rather than being uplit. Lighting designer Rogier van der Heide is known for this concept, which he also applied at the Marunouchi Building in Tokyo. Each node in the lighting design is individually controllable to allow for animations and color changes across the entire height of the tower. As all lighting is based on LED technology, and all fixtures are located on the structure itself, the lighting scheme consumes only 15% of the allowed maximum for façade lighting.

At the time of the design of Canton Tower, lighting designer Rogier van der Heide was Global Leader of Arup Lighting.

Measurements 
The tower has a total of 112 floors.

In addition, the tower's net usable area measures .

Guangzhou tower's original design height was a total of 612.2 meters (including a 1.2 meter lightning rod).

According to the Guangzhou Urban Planning Bureau and the Guangzhou Construction Engineering Supervision Co., Ltd., the Guangzhou tower adjusted total building height is 595.71 meters, with the main tower at a height of 448.80 meters, and the antenna mast height at 146.91 meters. The viewing platform is located in the tower mast antenna at a height of 488 meters.

Events 

As Guangzhou was selected to host the 2010 Asian Games, a small island in front of the tower was chosen to host the opening and closing ceremonies, as such, tower was chosen as the main protagonist of the ceremonies. Two weeks before the opening ceremonies of the games, the tower itself was opened to the public.
The Canton Tower hosted an annual Christmas Concert on Christmas Eve inside the tower's ground floor, making it the first concert to be held in the Canton Tower. Celebrated on Christmas Eve, the concert was held on 24 December 2012.

Geography 

The Canton Tower is situated alongside the Yiyuan Road (Yuejiang Road West), in the Haizhu District of Guangzhou, and is situated south of the Zhujiang New Town. Additionally, several famous landmarks surround the tower, including pagodas, a park towards the south, and several high-rise apartments, buildings, and skyscrapers, both commercial and residential.

See also 

 Cantonese architecture
 2010 Asian Games
 Guangdong
 Guangzhou
 Guangzhou Broadcasting Network
 Guangzhou TV Tower
 List of hyperboloid structures
 List of tallest freestanding structures in the world
 List of tallest towers in the world

Gallery

Construction history

Diagrams

References

External links 

 
 Canton Tower official website :: GzTvTower.info
 

Towers completed in 2010
Observation towers in China
Buildings and structures in Guangzhou
High-tech architecture
Hyperboloid structures
Haizhu District
Communication towers in China
Tourist attractions in Guangzhou
Restaurant towers
2010 establishments in China